Adolfína Tkačíková-Tačová (born 19 April 1939 in Petřkovice) is a Czech former gymnast who competed for Czechoslovakia in the 1960 Summer Olympics and in the 1964 Summer Olympics.

References

External links
 
 

1939 births
Living people
Czech female artistic gymnasts
Olympic gymnasts of Czechoslovakia
Gymnasts at the 1960 Summer Olympics
Gymnasts at the 1964 Summer Olympics
Olympic silver medalists for Czechoslovakia
Olympic medalists in gymnastics
Medalists at the 1964 Summer Olympics
Medalists at the 1960 Summer Olympics
Sportspeople from Ostrava